The 1957 Argentine Grand Prix was a Formula One motor race held on 13 January 1957 at the Buenos Aires circuit. It was race 1 of 8 in the 1957 World Championship of Drivers.

Race report 
Juan Manuel Fangio had left Ferrari for Maserati to attempt to win a fifth world championship with the help of their much modified 250Fs. Even without him, Ferrari had one of the strongest driver lineups in history, with Mike Hawthorn moving from BRM to join Peter Collins, Luigi Musso and Eugenio Castellotti.

Since the British teams were not present, Stirling Moss — who had signed for Vanwall — was part of the Maserati line-up with Jean Behra as third driver.

Fangio and Behra raced away into the distance as the rest of the field floundered. Moss's throttle linkage broke on the startline and he lost 10 laps having it fixed. The Ferraris were all suffering terribly with clutch problems, as both Collins and Musso burnt theirs out, while Hawthorn's was slipping badly.

Both Collins and Wolfgang von Trips took over Cesare Perdisa's Ferrari in an attempt to stop the Maseratis, but were powerless to stop them taking the first four places. Moss rejoined and set fastest lap on his way to 8th place.

Classification

Qualifying

Race

Notes
 – 1 point for fastest lap

Shared drives
 Car #20: Alfonso de Portago (49 laps) and José Froilán González (49 laps). They shared the 2 points for fifth place.
 Car #18: Cesare Perdisa (30 laps), Peter Collins (35 laps) and Wolfgang von Trips (33 laps).

Championship standings after the race 
Drivers' Championship standings

Note: Only the top five positions are included.

References

Argentine Grand Prix
Argentine Grand Prix
Argentine Grand Prix
Argentine Grand Prix